Raphitoma daphnelloides is an extinct species of sea snail, a marine gastropod mollusc in the family Raphitomidae.

Description

Distribution
Fossils of this extinct marine species were found in Eocene strata in France; age range: 40.4 to 37.2 Ma

References

 Gougerot, L., and Le Renard. "Clefs de Détermination des petites Espèces de Gastéropodes de L'Eocene du Bassin Parisien . XIX: Le Genre Pleurotomella." (1981).

External links
 

daphnelloides
Gastropods described in 1981